Ella Abraça Jobim or Ella Fitzgerald Sings the Antonio Carlos Jobim Songbook is a 1981 studio album by Ella Fitzgerald, devoted to the songs of Antônio Carlos Jobim.

It was reissued on CD in 1991, although the CD version does not include the songs "Don't Ever Go Away" and "Song of the Jet".

Though it is subtitled as such, the album is not usually considered part of Fitzgerald's 'Songbook' series, the last of the 'Songbook' albums having been recorded in 1964.

It was Fitzgerald's first album of music devoted to a single composer since 1972's Ella Loves Cole, and it was her only album recorded entirely in the bossa nova style, though she had been singing Jobim's songs since the mid-1960s.

Fitzgerald never worked with Antônio Carlos Jobim, though she appeared alongside Frank Sinatra for a 1967 television special that also featured Jobim.

The title has a pun, as Ela (with a single l) translates as "she". It can be translated as 'She Hugs Jobim' (Ela Abraça Jobim) or 'Ella Hugs Jobim".

Track listing
"Somewhere in the Hills (Favela)" (Vinícius de Moraes, Ray Gilbert) – 3:56
"The Girl from Ipanema (Garota de Ipanema)" (de Moraes, Norman Gimbel) – 3:50
"Dindi" (Ray Gilbert, Aloysio Oliveira) – 6:37
"Off Key (Desafinado)" (Newton Mendonça, Gene Lees) – 3:41
"Water to Drink (Água de Beber)" (de Moraes, Gimbel) – 2:44
"Dreamer (Vivo Sonhando)"  (Lees) – 4:55
"Quiet Nights of Quiet Stars (Corcovado)" (Lees) – 5:40
"Bonita" (Gilbert, Lees) – 2:50
"One Note Samba (Samba de Uma Nota Só)" (Mendonça, Hendricks) – 3:51
"Don't Ever Go Away (Por Causa de Você)" (Gilbert, Dolores Duran) - 2:52
"Triste" – 4:07
"How Insensitive (Insensatez)" (de Moraes, Gimbel) – 3:00
"He's a Carioca (Ela é Carioca)" (de Moraes, Gilbert) – 5:14
"This Love That I've Found (Só Tinha de Ser com Você)" (Oliveira) – 5:17
"A Felicidade" (de Moraes) – 2:19
"Wave" – 5:22
"Song of the Jet (Samba do Avião)"  (Lees) – 3:40
"Photograph (Fotografia)" (Gilbert) – 3:49
"Useless Landscape (Inútil Paisagem)" (Gilbert, Oliveira) – 7:59

All songs composed by Antônio Carlos Jobim, with lyricists indicated.

Personnel 
 Ella Fitzgerald - Vocals
 Clark Terry - Trumpet
 Zoot Sims - Tenor Saxophone
 Toots Thielemans - Harmonica
 Henry Trotter - Keyboards
 Mike Lang - Keyboards
 Clarence McDonald - Keyboards
 Joe Pass - Electric guitar (soloist)
 Oscar Castro-Neves - Acoustic guitar (soloist)
 Paul Jackson, Jr. - Rhythm guitar
 Mitch Holder - Rhythm guitar
 Roland Bautista - Rhythm guitar
 Abraham Laboriel - Double Bass
 Alex Acuña - Drums
 Paulinho da Costa - Percussion
 Erich Bulling - Song arrangements and conductor

Credits
Produced by Norman Granz
Associate producer - Paulinho da Costa
Recording – Humberto Gatica, Paul Aronoff
Percussion overdub and remix – Allen Sides
Mastering - Bernie Grundman (US) & Greg Fulginiti (International)

References

1981 albums
Bossa nova albums
Ella Fitzgerald albums
Pablo Records albums
Albums produced by Norman Granz